WBEC may refer to:

 WBEC (AM), a radio station (1420 AM) licensed to Pittsfield, Massachusetts, United States
 WBEC-FM, a radio station (95.9 FM) licensed to Pittsfield, Massachusetts, United States
 WBEC-TV, a television station (channel 25, virtual 63) licensed to Boca Raton, Florida, United States